Bryce Fullwood (born 11 May 1998 in Darwin, Australia) is an Australian racing driver currently racing in the Repco Supercars Championship with Brad Jones Racing in the No. 14 Holden ZB Commodore.
In 2019, Fullwood won the Dunlop Super2 Series with MW Motorsport.

Career results

Career summary

Supercars Championship results

Bathurst 1000 results

References

Living people
1998 births
Australian racing drivers
Supercars Championship drivers
People from Darwin, Northern Territory
Andretti Autosport drivers
United Autosports drivers
Kelly Racing drivers
Matt Stone Racing drivers